AP1 TV is a television channel based in Kathmandu, Nepal owned by Annapurna Media Network, the publishers of Annapurna Post. It was launched on March 31, 2017. The Chairman is Captain Rameshwor Thapa. AP1 HD provides wide range of television shows, live broadcast, sports, and events around the country.

TV shows on AP1 TV 

AP1 TV is Nepal's first satellite HD television. It was also noted for its international franchise show Nepal Idol. AP1 TV announced their new shows on Shrawan 1st, 2077. In which popular media personality Bhusan Dahal, Thakur Belbase, Prakash Subedi, singer Deepak Bajracharya, etc joined AP1 TV. New shows include The Bravo Delta Show, Khullamanch, Junkiri Dohori, The Musical Medicine Show, Good Morning Nepal, Risani Maaf, Glamour Guff, Rajatpat , AP Bahas, etc. From 2020 November 1, AP1 TV started to broadcast Good Morning Nepal which is complete package of different genre of program. It includes following program which is broadcast live from 6:30 am to 9:30 am. 
       
AP1 TV is known for its reality shows like Nepal Idol, Boogie Woogie, Ko Banchha Crorepati, Career Quiz, Public Speaker Nepal, The Idea Studio and Nepal Lok Star.

Sports  
After television was launched, it acquired broadcasting rights from ANFA, DPL, EPL, etc in 2017. But it lost the broadcasting rights in 2019 due to time mismanagement.

Some sports tournament telecasted live was: 
 Everest Premiere League
 Dhangadi Premiere League
 International Corporate Badminton Tournament
 Road to World Cup 
 2018 SAFF Championship
 Live Sports Event
 Pulsar Sahid Smarak A Division League
 2019 South Asian Games

Shows announced but did not air 
After the success of Nepal Idol Season 1, as per the demand of audience AP1 TV brought rights to Nepal's Got Talent from Fremantle Media. But was not able to air it since few audition clips were sent during online audition, making it a flop before telecasting. Also, the production company for Nepal's Cine Megastar was cancelled because of controversy. Ranabhumi was announced during test telecast but was not able to air it.

 Nepal's Got Talent
 Ranabhumi
 Nepal's Cine Megastar

Current Broadcast

Team 
 Capt. Rameswar Thapa - Chairman 
 Rajendra Shakya - Executive Vice–Chairman
 Tikaram Yatri - Chief Editor
 Roshan Shrestha - Chief Engineer

References

External links

Television channels in Nepal
2017 establishments in Nepal